Government Girl is a 1943 American romantic-comedy film, produced and directed by Dudley Nichols and starring Olivia de Havilland and Sonny Tufts. Based on a story by Adela Rogers St. Johns, and written by Dudley Nichols and Budd Schulberg, the film is about a secretary working in a factory during World War II who helps her boss navigate the complex political machinations of government in an effort to build bomber aircraft for the war effort.

Plot
Automobile engineer Ed Browne (Sonny Tufts) comes to Washington to appear in front of the War Construction Board. His mission is to supervise the building of bomber aircraft for the war. But when he arrives at the crowded hotel he is supposed to stay at, there are no rooms available. A friendly clerk at the hotel recognizes him from the paper and offers him room 2A.

Ed is unaware that the same room is reserved by Elizabeth "Smokey" Allard (Olivia de Havilland), for her friend May (Anne Shirley) who will marry an army sergeant, Joe Bates (James Dunn), that very night. The wedding takes place in the hotel lobby, but the groom has lost his ring, and Smokey borrows one from Ed, which leads him to believe that Smokey is the woman getting married. A series of unfortunate events that night leads to Joe being arrested by M.P.s, and he leaves a borrowed motorcycle behind in the hands of Smokey.

Smokey tries to find someone who can return the bike, and Ed happens to pass by on his way to the War Construction Board. When Smokey tells him she works at the board, he agrees to drive her there. It turns out Ed is Smokey's new boss. He learns that she is dating a man named Dana McGuire (Jess Barker), who is an adviser to Senator MacVickers (Harry Davenport). Dana soon proves to be too egoistical and ambitious for Smokey's taste.

When Ed announces his plan to make the aircraft factories more effective, producing double the amount of bombers each year, Smokey warns him not to stray too far off government recommendations. He ignores her warning, and goes ahead with his efficiency plan. When six months have passed, Ed has reached his goal, but he has also made enemies. One of them is C. L. Harvester (Paul Stanton), who has become a thorn in his side because of the way Ed has ignored government procedures, and cutting into Harvester's business earnings. The two men become bitter enemies.

Harvester soon teams up with Dana, the senator, and powerful Washington socialite Adele Wright (Agnes Moorehead), threatening Ed with a Senate investigation. Ed has enough trouble with personal issues, realizing that he has fallen for Smokey, while she has already received a proposal from Dana.

Smokey, however, by burning the information Harvester has brought to Dana, saves Ed's career. When her friend May sees this, she claims that Smokey has fallen in love with Ed. The two women then are recruited by the government to expose Count Bodinski (George Givot) as a spy. The mission is successful, with the files that Ed was suspected of stealing being returned to Dana the following day by Smokey. She also testifies on Ed's behalf at the hearing. Ed is off the hook, and follows Smokey home to propose to her.

Cast
As appearing in Government Girl, (main roles and screen credits identified): 

 Olivia de Havilland as Elizabeth "Smokey" Allard
 Sonny Tufts as E.H. "Ed" Browne
 Anne Shirley as May Harness Blake
 Jess Barker as Dana McGuire
 James Dunn as Sergeant Joe Bates
 Paul Stewart as Branch Owens
 Agnes Moorehead as Adele, Mrs. Delancey Wright
 Harry Davenport as Senator MacVickers
 Una O'Connor as Mrs. Harris
 Sig Ruman as Ambassador
 Paul Stanton as C.L. Harvester
 George Givot as Count Bodinsky

Production
While in pre-production, Government Girl went through numerous changes in casting and production personnel. Joseph Cotten was originally slated for the male lead, with Gladys George to play "Mrs. Wright." Both Barbara Stanwyck and Ginger Rogers turned down the role of Elizabeth, and Olivia de Havilland was cast. David Hempstead was initially scheduled to produce the film, but when he had to bow out because of scheduling conflicts, Dudley Nichols stepped in, in his first film where he was both director and producer. 
Sonny Tufts, borrowed from Paramount to star, was paired with Olivia de Havilland, who had run into studio politics at Warner Bros. on her last feature, Princess O'Rourke (1943) that had resulted in first, her suspension, and subsequent "assignment" by studio boss Jack L. Warner to producer David O. Selznick in return for Ingrid Bergman, whom Warner cast in Casablanca (1942). Selznick, in turn, loaned de Havilland to RKO.

Considering her ongoing lawsuit against her studio was the reason for her being punished with her assignment to Government Girl, she was vociferous that she did not enjoy the experience.

Principal photography on Government Girl took place between mid-June to August 4, 1943, with retakes on August 11–18.  Although the film was basically a studio production, second unit director Russell Metty filmed backgrounds in Washington, D.C.

Reception
Despite reservations by de Havilland, Government Girl was a moderate success, making a profit of $700,000. 

Critical reviews, however, were quick to point out that other wartime Washington-themed films were better. Bosley Crowther in The New York Times praised Nichols as a "first-class screen-writer" but as a director, "In some spots, his film is amusing. In long stretches, it is hopelessly dull." He also found, "the plot takes such sudden twists and sideslips, the pace is so uneven, the styles are so jumbled and the story, by and large, is so topically stale that the film has the look of an effort of a directorial amateur."

Notes

References

Bibliography

 Bubbeo, Daniel. The Women of Warner Brothers: The Lives and Careers of 15 Leading Ladies. Jefferson, North Carolina: McFarland & Co. Inc. Publishers, 2001. . 
 Jewell, Richard B. Slow Fade to Black: The Decline of RKO Radio Pictures. Oakland, California: University of California Press, 2016. .
 Jewell, Richard and Vernon Harbin. The RKO Story. New Rochelle, New York: Arlington House, 1982. .
 Koppes, Clayton R. and Gregory D. Black. Hollywood Goes to War: How Politics, Profits and Propaganda Shaped World War II Movies. New York: The Free Press, 1987. .
 Maltin, Leonard.  Leonard Maltin's Movie Encyclopedia. New York: Dutton, 1994. .
 Sperling, Cass Warner, Cork Millner and Jack Warner. Hollywood be Thy Name: The Warner Brothers Story. Lexington, Kentucky: University Press of Kentucky, 1998. .

External links

1943 films
1943 directorial debut films
1943 romantic comedy films
American aviation films
American black-and-white films
American romantic comedy films
Films based on short fiction
Films based on works by Adela Rogers St. Johns
Films directed by Dudley Nichols
Films set in Washington, D.C.
Films set on the home front during World War II
Films with screenplays by Dudley Nichols
RKO Pictures films
World War II films made in wartime
Films scored by Leigh Harline
1940s English-language films